Norwich was a borough constituency in Norfolk which was represented in the House of Commons of England from 1298 to 1707, in the House of Commons of Great Britain from 1707 to 1800, and in the House of Commons of the United Kingdom from 1801 until it was abolished for the 1950 general election. Consisting of the city of Norwich in Norfolk, it returned two members of parliament (MPs), elected by the bloc vote system.

It was replaced in 1950 by two new single-member constituencies, Norwich North and Norwich South.

Members of Parliament

1298–1660

1640–1950

Election results

Elections in the 1940s

Elections in the 1930s

Elections in the 1920s

Elections in the 1910s

Elections in the 1900s

Elections in the 1890s

Elections in the 1880s

 Caused by Bullard being unseated on petition.

Elections in the 1870s

 

 Caused by Huddleston's appointment as a Judge of the Court of Common Pleas. This by-election was later declared void on petition, and the writ was suspended, leaving Norwich with one MP until 1880.

 
 

 

 Caused by the previous by-election being declared void on petition.

 

 Caused by Stracey's election being declared void on petition.

Elections in the 1860s

 
 

 
 
 

 
 
 

 Caused by both the 1859 general election and the June by-election being declared void on petition due to bribery.

Elections in the 1850s

 
 

 Caused by Keppel's appointment as Treasurer of the Household.

 
 
 

 
 
 

 
 

 Caused by Peto's resignation in order to go to the Crimean War and construct the Grand Crimean Central Railway.

Elections in the 1840s

Elections in the 1830s

 
 
 
 

 On petition, Scarlett was unseated and Smith was declared elected.

 
 
 
 

 
 
 
 

 
 
 
 

 Wetherell and Sadler were proposed without their knowledge

 

 Caused by Grant's appointment as Judge Advocate General of the Armed Forces

References 

Robert Beatson, A Chronological Register of Both Houses of Parliament (London: Longman, Hurst, Res & Orme, 1807) 
D Brunton & D H Pennington, Members of the Long Parliament (London: George Allen & Unwin, 1954)
Cobbett's Parliamentary history of England, from the Norman Conquest in 1066 to the year 1803 (London: Thomas Hansard, 1808) 
 The Constitutional Year Book for 1913 (London: National Union of Conservative and Unionist Associations, 1913)
F W S Craig, British Parliamentary Election Results 1832–1885 (2nd edition, Aldershot: Parliamentary Research Services, 1989)
 
 Maija Jansson (ed.), Proceedings in Parliament, 1614 (House of Commons) (Philadelphia: American Philosophical Society, 1988)
 J E Neale, The Elizabethan House of Commons (London: Jonathan Cape, 1949)
 Robert Walcott, English Politics in the Early Eighteenth Century (Oxford: Oxford University Press, 1956)

Notes

Parliamentary constituencies in Norfolk (historic)
Constituencies of the Parliament of the United Kingdom established in 1298
Constituencies of the Parliament of the United Kingdom disestablished in 1950
Politics of Norwich